False Evidence, originally titled Madelon of the Redwoods, is a 1919 American silent drama film that was directed by Edwin Carewe. It stars Viola Dana, Wheeler Oakman, and Joseph King, and was released on April 21, 1919.

Cast
 Viola Dana as Madelon MacTavish
 Wheeler Oakman as Burr Gordon
 Joseph King as Lot Gordon
 Edward J. Connelly as Sandy MacTavish
 J. Patrick O'Malley as Richard MacTavish
 Peggy Pearce as Dorothy Fair
 Virginia Ross as Samanthy Brown

Production
On March 17, 1919, the Santa Cruz Evening News reported that Viola Dana and Wheeler Oakman, for Metro Pictures, had finished filming on location at Hopkins' Big Trees in Felton and were headed south to film the interior segments of Madelon of the Redwoods. According to Derek Whaley, Metro repurposed defunct buildings in a part of the park called Welch Grove to serve as a "pioneer town" for the film.

References

External links

lobby poster

Metro Pictures films
Films directed by Edwin Carewe
Films based on American novels
American silent feature films
American black-and-white films
Silent American drama films
1919 drama films
1919 films
1910s American films